Boondox has released four studio albums, and one EP on Psychopathic Records and one other album beforehand as Turncoat Dirty. He has released three studio albums under Majik Ninja Entertainment. He has also been in supergroups Psychopathic Rydas (Bullet, Full Clip, Lil Shank, Foe Foe, Cell Block, Sawed Off) and The Underground Avengers (Boondox, Bukshot, ClaAs). He was signed to Southern Hustlas Inc. (2004–2005), Psychopathic Records (2005–2012; 2013–2015) and Majik Ninja Entertainment (2016–present).

Albums

Album releases

Singles

Holiday Singles

Halloween Singles

Music videos

Group Albums

w/Psychopathic Rydas

w/The Underground Avengers

w/Crucifix
 TBA (2018/2019)

Appearances

Guest appearances 
 Insane Clown Posse - Featuring Freshness - "Lady In A Jaguar", "Kept Grindin' (ft. Psychopathic Records)" (2011)
 Insane Clown Posse - "When I'm Clownin' (Danny Brown Remix)" (2013)
 D Money - "George Bush (Fiddle Faddle) (ft. Bonecrusher & Boondox)" (2013)
 The Killjoy Club (Insane Clown Posse,  Da Mafia 6ix & Young Wicked) - Reindeer Games - "Rambo" (2014)

Guest appearances

Songs on mixtapes/compilations

Group Albums

Collab Singles

References 

Hip hop discographies